Trust is a British television crime drama, written by Richard McBrien and directed by David Drury, that was first broadcast on ITV on 4 May 1999. Originally broadcast in two parts, and also re-cut into three episodes for international broadcast, Trust stars Mark Strong as psychiatrist Michael Mitcham, who is accused of the murder of one of former patients, with whom he fathered a child. Meanwhile, his wife, Anne (Caroline Goodall), a successful solicitor, begins an affair with Michael's best friend, Andrew (Nathaniel Parker), who brings Michael's credibility into question during the trial for the crimes he is accused of.

The film was broadcast on BBC America on 1 January 2007 as the first in a series of five British thrillers previously unbroadcast in the United States. The film was also released on DVD in Germany in 2004, but this remains the only home video release to date. Notably, the DVD features audio dubbing in German, rather than subtitles.

Broadcast
The two parts of Trust attracted 8.24 and 7.76 million viewers respectively.

Reception
Adam Sweeting from The Guardian gave the film a mixed review, writing: "The term 'psychological thriller' is often used when 'routine whodunnit' would have been quite sufficient, but Trust genuinely fits the bill. Director David Drury has piled on the warning signals and the emotional turbulence. The background music is an eerie, oppressive mix of lurid orchestral writing and technological effects. Michael and Anne's home is like a three-dimensional model of the killer's diseased brain, with the camera stalking the open-plan walkways to peer through its glass walls like a murderous voyeur. The closing sequence was a mordant parody of the shower scene in Psycho, all panicky close-ups and shrieking violins."

Cast
 Mark Strong as Michael Mitcham
 Caroline Goodall as Anne Travers
 Nathaniel Parker as Andrew Pearce
 John McGlynn as DI Jim Hinton
 Caroline Strong as DS Sarah Miller
 Roger Griffiths as Trevor Macer
 Joseph Kpobie as Joshua Macer
 John Grillo as Dr. Ian Matthews
 Aneirin Hughes as Neil Davis
 Robert Lang as Nathan Anderson
 Georgia Mackenzie as Tara Reeves
 Felicity Montagu as Beth Simpson
 Hugh Simon as Geoff Keens
 Patrick Field	as Vere
 Abigail Thaw as Caroline
 Pip Torrens as Jenkins
 Mark Umbers as Simon

References

External links

ITV television dramas
1999 British television series debuts
1999 British television series endings
1990s British drama television series
1990s British crime television series
1990s British television miniseries
Carlton Television
Television series by ITV Studios
English-language television shows